The Tlaxcalans, or Tlaxcaltecs, are a Nahua people who live in the Mexican state of Tlaxcala.

Pre-Columbian history
The Tlaxcaltecs were originally a conglomeration of three distinct ethnic groups who spoke Nahuatl, Otomi, and Pinome that comprised the four city-states of the Tlaxcala Confederation. Eventually, the Nahuatl speakers became the dominant ethnic group.

Despite early attempts by the Mexica, the Tlaxcaltecs were never conquered by the Aztec Triple Alliance. Some of the wars between the Tlaxcalans and the Aztecs are called the xochiyaoyatl (flower wars), as their objective was not to conquer but rather to capture enemy warriors for sacrifice.

Spanish colonial history

Eager to overthrow the Aztecs, which were their hated enemies, the Tlaxcaltecs allied with Hernán Cortés and his fellow Spanish conquistadors and were instrumental in the invasion of Tenochtitlan, capital of the Aztec Empire, helping the Spanish reach the Valley of Anahuac and providing a key contingent of the invasion force. At the time, their Tlatoani or king was a man named Xicotencatl, and his son, named Xicotencatl the Younger, was prince and heir to the throne.

Due to their alliance with the Spanish Crown in the conquest of the Aztec Empire, the Tlaxcaltecs enjoyed exclusive privileges among the indigenous peoples of Mexico, including the right to carry guns, ride horses, hold noble titles, and to rule their settlements autonomously. This privileged treatment ensured Tlaxcallan loyalty to Spain over the centuries, even during the Mexican War of Independence, though Tlaxcala did host a strong pro-independence faction.

The Tlaxcaltecs were also instrumental in the establishment of a number of settlements in Northern Mexico (including parts of present-day southeastern Texas), where conquest of local tribes by the Spaniards had proved unsuccessful.  They settled areas inhabited by nomadic bellicose tribes (known as the Chichimeca) to pacify the local indigenous groups hostile to the Spanish Crown and to work in mines and haciendas.

The Tlaxcaltec colonies in the Chichimeca included settlements in the modern states of Coahuila, Durango, Jalisco, Nuevo León, San Luis Potosí, and Zacatecas. The colonies included Nueva Tlaxcala de Nuestra Señora de Guadalupe de Horcasistas, today known as Guadalupe, and Santiago de las Sabinas, today known as Sabinas Hidalgo, in Nuevo León; Villa de Nueva Tlaxcala de Quiahuistlán, today known as Colotlán in Jalisco; and San Esteban de Nueva Tlaxcala in Coahuila, today part of Saltillo.

Post-colonial history
As of the 2010 Mexican census, there were estimated to be more than 23,000 Nahuatl speakers.

Notes

Mesoamerican cultures
History of Tlaxcala
Indigenous peoples in Mexico
Nahua people
Ethnic groups in Mexico